Shad Morad Mahalleh, also known as Shah Morad Mahalleh, may refer to:
 Shad Morad Mahalleh, Chaboksar
 Shad Morad Mahalleh, Kelachay